, also romanized as gambaru,  is a ubiquitous Japanese word which roughly means to slog on tenaciously through tough times.

The word ganbaru is often translated to mean "doing one's best", but in practice, it means doing more than one's best. The word emphasizes "working with perseverance" or "toughing it out".

Ganbaru means "to commit oneself fully to a task and to bring that task to an end". It can be translated to mean persistence, tenacity, doggedness, and hard work. The term has a unique importance in Japanese culture.

The New York Times said of Shoichi Yokoi, the Japanese holdout who surrendered in Guam in January 1972, that in Japan "even those embarrassed by his constant references to the Emperor felt a measure of admiration at his determination and ganbaru spirit". After the 1995 Kobe earthquake, the slogan "Gambaro Kobe" was used to encourage the people of the disaster region as they worked to rebuild their city and their lives. After the 2011 Tōhoku earthquake and tsunami, gambaru was one of the most commonly heard expressions.

Etymology 
The modern spelling is Ateji using the  頑 character to represent an unknown original lexeme.

The sense was originally to be stubborn, to be obstinate, with negative overtones.

There are three theories of the origin:

 Sense shift from 眼張る (ganbaru, "to keep watch on something, to stare at something", literally "keep one's eye on something")
 Shift in reading from 我に張る (ga ni haru, literally "to stick to one's desires, to insist on one's point of view")
 An unknown etymology based on the historical kana form ぐわんばる

Analysis
Gambaru focuses attention on the importance of finishing a task and never stopping until a goal is achieved. The continuing effort to overcome obstacles (even if not successful) is an important concept in Japan.

Unlike the related, but passive gaman, ganbaru is an active process.

Although there are many near synonyms in Japanese, there are few antonyms.

See also
 The Book of Five Rings
 Jiayou, a Chinese term of similar meaning
 Paiting, a Korean term of similar meaning
 Sisu, a Finnish word denoting tenacity and a broader concept
 Stoicism

References

External links 

Matsuoka, R., Smith, I., & Uchimura, M. (2011). Discourse analysis of encouragement in healthcare manga. Journal of Pan-Pacific Association of Applied Linguistics, 15(1), 49-66.

Japanese words and phrases
Virtue